This list only includes the public school districts in the state of Oklahoma, of which there are approximately 471 as of Fall 2003. The trend is toward a consolidation every year or two, which is slowly lessening this number.

Adair County
Bell
Cave Springs
Dahlonegah 
Greasy
Maryetta
Peavine
Rocky Mountain
Skelly
Stilwell
Watts
Westville
Zion

Alfalfa County
Burlington
Cherokee
Timberlake

Atoka County
Atoka
Caney
Farris
Harmony
Lane
Stringtown
Tushka

Beaver County
Balko
Beaver
Forgan
Turpin

Beckham County
Elk City
Erick
Merritt
Sayre

Blaine County
Canton
Geary
Okeene
Watonga

Bryan County
Achille
Bennington
Caddo
Calera
Colbert
Durant
Rock Creek
Silo

Caddo County
Anadarko
Binger-Oney
Boone-Apache
Carnegie
Cement
Cyril
Fort Cobb-Broxton
Gracemont
Hinton
Hydro-Eakly
Lookeba-Sickles

Canadian County
Banner
Calumet
Darlington
El Reno
Maple
Mustang
Piedmont
Riverside
Union City
Yukon

Carter County
Ardmore
Dickson
Fox
Healdton
Lone Grove
Plainview
Springer
Wilson
Zaneis

Cherokee County
Briggs
Grand View
Hulbert
Keys
Lost City
Lowrey
Norwood
Peggs
Shady Grove
Tahlequah
Tenkiller
Woodall

Choctaw County
Boswell
Fort Towson
Hugo
Soper
Swink

Cimarron County
Boise City
Felt
Keyes
Plainview

Cleveland County
Lexington
Little Axe
Moore
Noble
Norman
Robin Hill

Coal County
Coalgate
Cottonwood
Olney
Tupelo

Comanche County
Bishop
Cache
Chattanooga
Elgin
Fletcher
Flower Mound
Geronimo
Indiahoma
Lawton
Sterling

Cotton County
Big Pasture
Temple
Walters

Craig County
Bluejacket
Ketchum
Vinita
Welch
White Oak

Creek County
Allen-Bowden
Bristow
Depew
Drumright
Gypsy
Kellyville
Kiefer
Lone Star
Mannford
Milfay
Mounds
Oilton
Olive
Pretty Water
Sapulpa

Custer County
Arapaho
Butler
Clinton
Thomas-Fay-Custer Unified
Weatherford

Delaware County
Cleora
Colcord
Grove
Jay
Kansas
Kenwood
Leach
Moseley
Oaks-Mission

Dewey County
Seiling
Taloga
Vici

Ellis County
Arnett
Fargo
Gage
Shattuck

Garfield County
Chisholm
Covington-Douglas
Drummond
Enid
Garber
Kremlin-Hillsdale
Pioneer-Pleasant Vale
Waukomis

Garvin County
Elmore City-Pernell
Lindsay
Maysville
Paoli
Pauls Valley
Stratford
Whitebead
Wynnewood

Grady County
Alex
Amber-Pocasset
Bridge Creek
Chickasha
Friend
Middleberg
Minco
Ninnekah
Pioneer
Rush Springs
Tuttle
Verden

Grant County
Deer Creek-Lamont
Medford
Pond Creek-Hunter
Wakita

Greer County
Granite
Mangum

Harmon County
Hollis

Harper County
Buffalo
Laverne

Haskell County
Keota
Kinta
McCurtain
Stigler
Whitefield

Hughes County
Calvin
Dustin
Holdenville
Moss
Stuart
Wetumka

Jackson County
Altus
Blair
Duke
Navajo
Olustee-Eldorado

Jefferson County
Ringling
Ryan
Terral
Waurika

Johnston County
Coleman
Mannsville
Milburn
Mill Creek
Ravia
Tishomingo
Wapanucka

Kay County
Blackwell
Kaw City
Kildare
Newkirk
Peckham
Ponca City
Tonkawa

Kingfisher County
Cashion
Dover
Hennessey
Kingfisher
Lomega
Okarche

Kiowa County
Hobart
Lone Wolf
Mountain View-Gotebo
Snyder

Latimer County
Buffalo Valley
Panola
Red Oak
Wilburton

Le Flore County
Arkoma
Bokoshe
Cameron
Fanshawe
Heavener
Hodgen
Howe
Le Flore
Monroe
Panama
Pocola
Poteau
Shady Point
Spiro
Talihina
Whitesboro
Wister

Lincoln County
Agra
Carney
Chandler
Davenport
Meeker
Prague
Stroud
Wellston
White Rock

Logan County
Coyle
Crescent
Guthrie
Mulhall-Orlando

Love County
Greenville
Marietta
Thackerville
Turner

Major County
Aline-Cleo
Cimarron
Fairview
Ringwood

Marshall County
Kingston
Madill

Mayes County
Adair
Chouteau-Mazie
Locust Grove
Osage
Pryor
Salina
Spavinaw
Wickliffe

McClain County
Blanchard
Dibble
Newcastle
Purcell
Washington
Wayne

McCurtain County
Battiest
Broken Bow
Denison
Eagletown
Forest Grove
Glover
Haworth
Holly Creek
Idabel
Lukfata
Smithville
Valliant
Wright City

McIntosh County
Checotah
Eufaula
Hanna
Midway
Ryal
Stidham

Murray County
Davis
Sulphur

Muskogee County
Boynton
Braggs
Fort Gibson
Haskell
Hilldale
Muskogee
Oktaha
Porum
Wainwright
Warner
Webbers Falls

Noble County
Billings
Frontier
Morrison
Perry

Nowata County
Nowata
Oklahoma Union
South Coffeyville

Okmulgee County
Beggs
Dewar
Henryetta
Liberty
Morris
Okmulgee
Preston
Schulter
Twin Hills
Wilson

Okfuskee County
Bearden
Boley
Graham
Mason
Okemah
Paden
Weleetka

Oklahoma County
Bethany
Choctaw/Nicoma Park
Crooked Oak
Crutcho
Deer Creek
Edmond
Harrah
Jones
Luther
Midwest City/Del City
Millwood
Oakdale
Oklahoma City
Putnam City
Western Heights

Osage County
Anderson
Avant
Barnsdall
Bowring
Hominy
McCord
Osage Hills
Pawhuska
Prue
Shidler
Woodland
Wynona

Ottawa County
Afton
Commerce
Fairland
Miami
Quapaw
Turkey Ford
Wyandotte

Pawnee County
Cleveland
Jennings
Pawnee

Payne County
Cushing
Glencoe
Oak Grove
Perkins-Tryon
Ripley
Stillwater
Yale

Pittsburg County
Canadian
Crowder
Frink-Chambers
Haileyville
Hartshorne
Haywood
Indianola
Kiowa
Krebs
McAlester
Pittsburg
Quinton
Savanna
Tannehill

Pontotoc County
Ada
Allen
Byng
Latta
Roff
Stonewall
Vanoss

Pottawatomie County
Asher
Bethel
Dale
Earlsboro
Grove
Macomb
Maud
McLoud
North Rock Creek
Pleasant Grove
Shawnee
South Rock Creek
Tecumseh
Wanette

Pushmataha County
Albion
Antlers
Clayton
Moyers
Nashoba
Rattan
Tuskahoma

Roger Mills County
Cheyenne
Hammon
Leedey
Reydon
Sweetwater

Rogers County
Catoosa
Chelsea
Claremore
Foyil
Inola
Justus-Tiawah
Oologah-Talala
Sequoyah
Verdigris

Seminole County
Bowlegs
Butner
Justice
Konawa
New Lima
Pleasant Grove
Sasakwa
Seminole
Strother
Varnum
Wewoka

Sequoyah County
Belfonte
Brushy
Central
Gans
Gore
Liberty
Marble City
Moffett
Muldrow
Roland
Sallisaw
Vian

Stephens County
Bray-Doyle
Central High
Comanche
Duncan
Empire
Grandview
Marlow
Velma-Alma

Texas County
Goodwell
Guymon
Hardesty
Hooker
Optima
Straight
Texhoma
Tyrone
Yarbrough

Tillman County
Davidson
Frederick
Grandfield
Tipton

Tulsa County
Berryhill
Bixby
Broken Arrow
Collinsville
Glenpool
Jenks
Keystone
Liberty
Owasso
Sand Springs
Skiatook
Sperry
Tulsa
Union

Wagoner County
Coweta
Okay
Porter Consolidated
Wagoner

Washington County
Bartlesville
Caney Valley
Copan
Dewey

Washita County
Burns Flat-Dill City
Canute
Cordell
Sentinel

Woods County
Alva
Freedom
Waynoka

Woodward County
Fort Supply
Mooreland
Sharon-Mutual
Woodward

External links
NCES Search for Public Schools and Districts - This site, run by the National Center for Education Statistics, keeps a national database of school districts, updated yearly but usually a year or two out of date.